Mysore Junction railway station, re-christened as Mysuru Junction railway station (station code: MYS) is a railway station on Mysore–Bangalore railway line serving the city of Mysore, Karnataka, India. Previously Mysore was connected to Bangalore by a single-line metre-gauge track.  It was later converted into non-electrified broad-gauge line.  It has now been converted to a double-line, electrified route.

History
The heritage Mysore Railway Station building was constructed in the late 1940s.  Currently, it has 6 platforms.  All are connected by barrier-free access via lifts, subway and 2 escalators.  On the right side of the building, are counters for unreserved ticketing and advance booking.  There are also automatic ticket vending machines. 
The Mysore Railway Division and the Mysore Railway station have a reputation for cleanliness.  According to Railways authorities, it is the cleanest of the 3 division of the South Western Railways.  As part of the beautification, in 2019 a sculpture "Life is a Journey" by local artist Arun Yogiraj was installed in the entrance to the building.  The sculpture consists of 6 statues representing travelers in typical postures.

Railway museum
Close to the railway station is a museum which has exhibits of vintage locomotives. It was established in 1979 by the Indian Railways, and is the second such museum after the one in Delhi. One of the exhibits is the Maharani Saloon Carriage, with a kitchen and royal toilet, dating back to 1899, belonging to the Royal family of Mysore. Wooden doors and pillars of the old Srirangapatna railway station are also on display. Other exhibits include a 1925 Austin rail motor car, 1900-built WG Bagnall 1625, a Surrey Iron Railway (SIR) Class E 37244 4-4-4T locomotive built in 1920 by the North British Locomotive Co, a Southern Railway Class TS/1 37338 2-6-2T built by WG Bagnall for the Mysore Railways in 1932, and so forth.

Lines
Mysore–Chamarajanagar branch line
Mysore–Bangalore railway line
Mysore–Hassan railway line This is a railway line which connects Mysuru Junction with  via Krishnarajasagara railway station and

See also
 Mysore–Bangalore railway line
 Mysore–Chamarajanagar branch line

References

External links
 Commercial Branch Mysore for Parcels, Goods—Freight related quires

Railway stations in Mysore district
Mysore railway division
Transport in Mysore
Buildings and structures in Mysore
Railway stations opened in 1870
Railway junction stations in Karnataka